Todd Pace is an American competitive swimmer. He was a member of the US national swim team, competing in sprint events for over six years at the international level.

Early life 
Pace began swimming with Cypress Fairbanks Swim Club in 1982. He attended Westfield High School in the Spring Independent School District in Houston, TX and was on the varsity team specializing in freestyle.

Career 
Pace attended Southern Methodist University. He set a school record in the 50 yard freestyle in 1990. The record stood until 1996. After college, Pace was a national team member from 1989 to 1995. During those years, he competed at meets in 10 different countries. He won the 50-meter freestyle event at the Pan American Games in 1991.

References

Living people
American male swimmers
Southern Methodist University alumni
Pan American Games medalists in swimming
Pan American Games gold medalists for the United States
Year of birth missing (living people)
Swimmers at the 1991 Pan American Games
Medalists at the 1991 Pan American Games